The 1995 Pan American Games, officially known as the XII Pan American Games, were a continental multi-sport event held in Mar del Plata, Argentina, from March 11 to March 26, 1995. At the Games, 5,144 athletes selected from 42 National Olympic Committees (NOCs) participated in events in 34 sports. Thirty-one nations earned medals during the competition, and fifteen won at least one gold medal.

Medal table 

The ranking in this table is based on medal counts published by several media organizations. By default, the table is ordered by the number of gold medals won by the athletes representing a nation. (In this context, a nation is an entity represented by a NOC). The number of silver medals is taken into consideration next and then the number of bronze medals. If nations are still tied, equal ranking is given and they are listed alphabetically by IOC country code.

To sort this table by nation, total medal count, or any other column, click on the  icon next to the column title.

Notes 

  Some sources appoint that the United States earned 124 silver medals, instead of 125. This would result in a total of 424 medals.
  Therefore, according to some sources, 432 silver medals were awarded during the Games, instead of 433. This would result in a total number of 1,372 medals awarded.

References 

General

 

Specific

See also 

Medal table
Pan American Games medal tables